Allarodu is a 1994 Telugu-language comedy film, produced by M.A.Gapoor, P. Purshothama Rao under the Ammulya Arts banner and directed by K. Ajay Kumar. It stars Rajendra Prasad, Surabhi  and music composed by Vidyasagar. The film was recorded as a flop at the box office in India.

Plot
The film begins with Krishna Murthy (Rajendra Prasad) a playboy, his wife Satyabhama (Surabhi) restrains him. After a few comic incidents, one night, when Bhama is absent, Krishna Murthy detects a pregnant woman Jayanthi (Latha Sri) in his car. Being commiserate he gives her shelter but for a mishap, she delivers a baby boy therein. Here as a flabbergast, one night Krishna Murthy Jayanthi is slaughtered by someone when he returns from the office. At the same time, Inspector Ravi (K. Naga Babu) his best friend passing on that way and spots it. Affirming Krishna Murthy as guiltless he advises him to bury the dead body which he does so. After some time, Bhama arrives home when Krishna Murthy misrepresents the baby as his friend's child who lost his parents in an accident. At present, as a cliffhanger, Krishna Murthy is haunted by a man Naidu (Nizhalgal Ravi) regarding Jayanthi. Immediately he informs Ravi, in that quicksand, they decide to shift the body when, unfortunately, Krishna Murthy is caught by the police. Right now, Krishna Murthy maintains silence as he refuses to defame Ravi. Right now, Naidu appears in the prison as a CBI officer proclaiming Jayanthi as Ravi's wife. Just now, Krishna Murthy is astonished to know Ravi as the homicide of Jayanthi. Soon after, fortuitously, Bhama unearths the wedding Video Cassette of Ravi & Jayanthi. Being cognizant of it, Ravi hits and tries to knock out Bhama too. At last, she is safeguarded by Krishna Murthy and Naidu ceases Ravi. Finally, the movie ends on a happy note with the reunion of the couple.

Cast
Rajendra Prasad as Krishna Murthy
Surabhi as Satyabhama
K.Naga Babu as Ravi
Brahmanandam as Satguru Murthy
Mallikarjuna Rao as Aakasa Ramaiah
Tanikella Bharani
Nizhalgal Ravi as Naidu
Ananth Babu
Chidatala Appa Rao
Silk Smitha as Beauty Queen Sneha
Latha Sri as Jayanthi
Radha Prashanthi as Sundari
Y. Vijaya as Satyabhama's mother

Soundtrack

Music composed by Vidyasagar. Lyrics were written by Bhuvana Chandra. Music released on Supreme Music Company.

References

Films scored by Vidyasagar
Indian comedy films
1990s Telugu-language films
1994 comedy films
1994 films